José Luis López (born 17 June 1998) is a Chilean handball player for Unión Machali and the Chilean national team.

He participated at the 2017 World Men's Handball Championship.

Individual awards and achievements
2017 Pan American Men's Youth Handball Championship:All Star Pivot

References

1998 births
Living people
Chilean male handball players
South American Games bronze medalists for Chile
South American Games medalists in handball
Competitors at the 2018 South American Games
21st-century Chilean people
20th-century Chilean people